The Royal Academy of Engineering (RAEng) is the United Kingdom's national academy of engineering.

The Academy was founded in June 1976 as the Fellowship of Engineering with support from Prince Philip, Duke of Edinburgh, who became the first senior fellow and remained so until his death. The Fellowship was incorporated and granted a royal charter on 17 May 1983 and became the Royal Academy of Engineering on 16 March 1992. It is governed according to the charter and associated statutes and regulations (as amended from time to time).

History
Conceived in the late 1960s, during the Apollo space program and Harold Wilson's espousal of "white heat of technology", the Fellowship of Engineering was born in the year of Concorde's first commercial flight.

The Fellowship's first meeting, at Buckingham Palace on 11 June 1976, enrolled 126 of the UK's leading engineers. The first fellows included Air Commodore Sir Frank Whittle, the jet engine developer, the structural engineer Sir Ove Arup, radar pioneer Sir George G. MacFarlane, the inventor of the bouncing bomb, Sir Barnes Wallis, and father of the UK computer industry Sir Maurice Wilkes. The Fellowship's first president, Christopher Hinton, had driven the UK's supremacy in nuclear power.

The Fellowship focused on championing excellence in all fields of engineering. Activities began in earnest in the mid-1970s with the Distinction lecture series, now known as the Hinton lectures. The Fellowship was asked to advise the Department of Industry for the first time, and the Academy became host and presenter of the MacRobert Award.

In the 1980s, the Fellowship received its own royal charter along with its first government grant-in-aid. At the same time it also received significant industrial funding, initiated its research programme to build bridges between academia and industry and opened its doors to international and honorary fellows.

In 1990, the Academy launched its first major initiative in education, Engineering Education Continuum, which evolved into the BEST Programme and Shape the Future and Tomorrow's Engineers.

The Academy's increasing level of influence – in policy, research and education – was recognized when it was granted a royal title and became The Royal Academy of Engineering in 1992.

The Academy's current logo is inspired by the Neolithic hand axe, humans' first technological advance, which was taken to be a symbol appropriate to the Academy, supposedly representative of the ever-changing relationship between humanity and technology.

Location
The Academy's premises, 3–4 Carlton House Terrace, are in a Grade I listed building overlooking St James's Park, designed by architect John Nash and owned by the Crown Estate. The Academy shares the Terrace with two of its sister academies, the British Academy and the Royal Society as well as other institutes.

The building was renamed Prince Philip House, after renovation works were completed in 2012.

Activities
The Academy is instrumental in two policy alliances set up in 2009 to provide coherent advice on engineering education and policy across the profession: Education for Engineering and Engineering the Future.

The Academy is one of four agencies that receive funding from the UK's Department for Business, Innovation and Skills for activities that support government policy on public understanding of science and engineering.

As part of its programme to communicate the benefits and value of engineering to society, the Academy publishes a quarterly magazine, Ingenia . The Academy says that Ingenia is written for a non-specialist audience and is "aimed at all those with an interest in engineering, whether working in business and industry, government, academia or the financial community". The Academy also makes Ingenia available to A-Level students in 3,000 schools in the UK.

Presidents 
The president of the Royal Academy of Engineering, the elected officer of the Academy, presides over meetings of the council. The president is elected for a single term of not more than five years.

Fellows 

The Fellowship currently includes over 1,500 engineers from all sectors and disciplines of engineering. The fellows, distinguished by the title Fellow of The Royal Academy of Engineering and the post-nominal designation FREng, lead, guide and contribute to the Academy's work and provide expertise.

The Royal Fellows of the Academy are the duke of Kent and the princess royal.

Diversity
The Academy strives to ensure that the pool of candidates for election to the Fellowship better reflects the diverse make-up of society as a whole. It set up the Proactive Membership Committee in 2008 to identify and support the nomination of candidates from underrepresented areas, with the aim of boosting the number of women candidates, engineers from industry and small and medium enterprises, those from emerging technologies and ethnically diverse backgrounds.

Awards and prizes 
 With the support of the Worshipful Company of Engineers, the Academy manages the annual Royal Academy of Engineering MacRobert Award, the premier prize for UK innovation in engineering. First presented in 1969, the award honors the winning company with a gold medal and the team members with a prize of £50,000.
 The Academy oversees the awarding of the Queen Elizabeth Prize for Engineering (QEPrize). The QEPrize is an international, £1 million engineering prize that "rewards and celebrates the engineers responsible for a ground-breaking innovation that has been of global benefit to humanity". The objective of the prize is to "raise the public profile of engineering and to inspire young people to become engineers".
 The Academy's Sir George Macfarlane Medal is an annual award that "recognizes a UK engineer who has demonstrated excellence in the early stage of their career".
 The President's Medal
 The Prince Philip Medal, named after Prince Philip, Duke of Edinburgh, and "awarded periodically to an engineer of any nationality who has made an exceptional contribution to engineering as a whole through practice, management or education."
 Chair in Emerging Technologies, a scheme providing long-term support to visionary researchers in developing technologies with high potential to deliver economic and social benefit to the United Kingdom.

See also
Engineering Development Trust
Engineering
Glossary of engineering
Royal Academy of Engineering International Medal

References

 
Scientific organizations established in 1976
Engineering societies based in the United Kingdom
United Kingdom
1976 establishments in the United Kingdom
Organisations based in the City of Westminster